Underworld are a British electronic group, and principal name under which duo Karl Hyde and Rick Smith have recorded together since 1983, though they have also worked together under various names both before and after adopting the Underworld moniker. The band is perhaps best known for "Born Slippy Nuxx", a track made popular in the Danny Boyle 1996 hit film Trainspotting. The first two albums they recorded together were with the band 'Freur'.

Albums

Studio albums

Compilation albums

Soundtracks

Live albums

Extended plays

Singles

As Underworld

As The Screen Gemz
"I Can't Stand Cars / Teenage Teenage" (1979)

As Lemon Interupt
"Dirty / Minniapolis" (1992)
"Eclipse / Big Mouth" (1992)

Videography
Kiteless (1996)
Footwear Repairs by Craftsmen at Competitive Prices (1997)
Beaucoup Video (1999)
Everything, Everything (2000)
Book of Jam – Video (2007)
The Bells the Bells (2008)
Barking: The Films (2010)
Live from the Roundhouse (2011)
Drift Series 1 Films (2019)

Other appearances

Soundtracks

 "Promised Land" was recorded for the 1990 erotic film Wild Orchid.
 "Oh" was recorded for the 1997 romantic/black comedy film A Life Less Ordinary.
 "8 Ball" was recorded for the 2000 drama film The Beach, and available on the film's soundtrack album, released by London Records in the UK. It also later appeared on the 1992–2002 compilation.

Compilations
 "Second Hand" is a significant re-working of "Thing in a Book" which appeared exclusively on Café del Mar, Volume 1.
 "To Heal (And Restore Broken Bodies)" appears on Songs for Tibet: The Art of Peace.

Collaborations
 "Downpipe" is a Mark Knight, D. Ramirez single, featuring Underworld.
 "The First Note Is Silent" is a High Contrast single, featuring Tiësto and Underworld.
 "Two Hundred & Thirty Eight Days" is a High Contrast song, featuring Underworld.
 "Ten" is a Sander Van Doorn & Mark Knight single, featuring Underworld.
 "Baby Wants To Ride" - originally by Frankie Knuckles - is a single featuring the collaborative efforts of Underworld, Pete Heller, Terry Farley and The Misterons.
 "Teatime Dub Encounters" is a collaborative effort between Underworld and Iggy Pop.
 "Too Little Too Late" is a Joris Voorn song, featuring Underworld.

Remixes

Notes
A  Chart position for 2014 re-release. Oricon chart positions before 1999 are not available for Underworld.

References

External links

Discographies of British artists
Electronic music discographies